Auberry is a census-designated place (CDP) in Fresno County, California, United States. The population was 2,369 at the 2010 census, up from 2,053 at the 2000 census.

Geography

Climate
Auberry has a Mediterranean climate (Köppen Csa) with cool, rainy winters and hot, dry summers. Its hardiness zone is 8a.

History
The Auberry post office was established in 1884, and following moves in 1887 and 1888, it was located at its present site in 1906. The place is named for Al Yarborough and is spelled phonetically as his name was pronounced.

The Auberry Band of the Mono people was called unaħpaahtyħ, (that which is on the other side [of the San Joaquin River]) in the Mono language. 

Auberry was also a stop on the San Joaquin and Eastern Railroad, which was built to facilitate the construction of the Big Creek Hydroelectric Project.

Demographics

2010
At the 2010 census Auberry had a population of 2,369. The racial makeup of Auberry was 2,048 (86.4%) White, 10 (0.4%) African American, 105 (4.4%) Native American, 24 (1.0%) Asian, 2 (0.1%) Pacific Islander, 68 (2.9%) from other races, and 112 (4.7%) from two or more races. Hispanic or Latino of any race were 309 people (13.0%).

The census reported that 2,235 people (94.3% of the population) lived in households, no one lived in non-institutionalized group quarters and 134 (5.7%) were institutionalized.

There were 849 households, 284 (33.5%) had children under the age of 18 living in them, 488 (57.5%) were opposite-sex married couples living together, 93 (11.0%) had a female householder with no husband present, 40 (4.7%) had a male householder with no wife present. There were 50 (5.9%) unmarried opposite-sex partnerships, and 3 (0.4%) same-sex married couples or partnerships. 188 households (22.1%) were one person and 83 (9.8%) had someone living alone who was 65 or older. The average household size was 2.63. There were 621 families (73.1% of households); the average family size was 3.04.

The age distribution was 531 people (22.4%) under the age of 18, 187 people (7.9%) aged 18 to 24, 425 people (17.9%) aged 25 to 44, 746 people (31.5%) aged 45 to 64, and 480 people (20.3%) who were 65 or older. The median age was 46.0 years. For every 100 females, there were 98.4 males. For every 100 females age 18 and over, there were 96.6 males.

There were 949 housing units at an average density of ,of which 849 were occupied, 646 (76.1%) by the owners and 203 (23.9%) by renters. The homeowner vacancy rate was 2.7%; the rental vacancy rate was 3.7%. 1,649 people (69.6% of the population) lived in owner-occupied housing units and 586 people (24.7%) lived in rental housing units.

2000
At the 2000 census there were 2,053 people, 722 households, and 539 families in the CDP. The racial makeup of the CDP was 86.65% White, 0.44% Black or African American, 5.16% Native American, 0.73% Asian, 0.10% Pacific Islander, 2.05% from other races, and 4.87% from two or more races. 8.52% of the population were Hispanic or Latino of any race.
Of the 722 households 35.6% had children under the age of 18 living with them, 61.8% were married couples living together, 9.4% had a female householder with no husband present, and 25.3% were non-families. 21.3% of households were one person and 10.0% were one person aged 65 or older. The average household size was 2.67 and the average family size was 3.12.

The age distribution was 26.3% under the age of 18, 6.2% from 18 to 24, 22.5% from 25 to 44, 26.2% from 45 to 64, and 18.9% 65 or older. The median age was 42 years. For every 100 females, there were 94.0 males. For every 100 females age 18 and over, there were 90.0 males.

The median household income was $34,621 and the median family income was $42,083. Males had a median income of $36,172 versus $27,097 for females. The per capita income for the CDP was $18,106. About 9.4% of families and 13.8% of the population were below the poverty line, including 24.4% of those under age 18 and 17.6% of those age 65 or over.

References

Census-designated places in Fresno County, California
Populated places established in 1884
Census-designated places in California
1884 establishments in California